Andrea Helen Hams (née Miller, born 13 March 1982) is a New Zealand representative weightlifter and former hurdler.

At the 2010 Commonwealth Games she won the bronze medal in the women's 100 m hurdles.

She was selected to compete in the sport of weightlifting (69 kg class) at the 2018 Commonwealth Games.

Achievements in athletics

Achievements in weightlifting 
Source: MILLER Andrea Helen NZL at iwf.net

References

External links

Andrea Miller’s amazing journey from hurdles to weightlifting at gc2018.com
 

New Zealand female hurdlers
New Zealand female weightlifters
Commonwealth Games bronze medallists for New Zealand
Athletes (track and field) at the 2010 Commonwealth Games
Commonwealth Games medallists in athletics
Universiade medalists in athletics (track and field)
1982 births
Living people
Universiade bronze medalists for New Zealand
Oceanian Athletics Championships winners
Medalists at the 2009 Summer Universiade
Medallists at the 2010 Commonwealth Games